The FIM SuperEnduro World Championship is an endurocross series held primarily in Europe since 2007. It is held from October to March, during the Northern Hemisphere winter and the Enduro World Championship off-season. Circuits are built inside stadiums or arenas, recreating obstacles such as rocks, boulders and logs.

The series had its first season in 2007–08 under the name FIM Indoor Enduro World Cup. In 2010–11 it was renamed FIM Indoor Enduro World Championship and in 2011/12 it adopted its current designation.

The championship is promoted since 2012–13 by ABC Communication, the same company as the Enduro World Championship. It introduced junior and women's classes in addition to the men's Prestige class. For the 2013–14 season, the schedule expanded to include two events in the Americas (Brasil and Mexico).

Venues 
The longest-running event is the Barcelona Indoor Enduro, where endurocross debuted in 2000.
  Barcelona (2007/08 - 2013/14)
  Madrid (2008/09, 2015/16)
  Vigo (2009/10)
  Munich (2007/08)
  Genova (2007/08 - 2010/11)
  Riesa (2014/15 - 2016/17)
  Prague (2015/16)
  Lodz (2011/12 - 2013/14, 2015/16)
  Gdansk (2014/15)
  Krakow (2016/17)
  Helsinki (2014/15)
  Cahors (2014/15)
  Tours (2011/12 - 2013/14)
  Sheffield (2009/10)
  Liverpool (2012/13 - 2013/14)
  Pinamar (2015/16)
  Belo Horizonte (2012/13 - 2015/16)
  Guadalajara (2012/13 - 2014/15)

Men medallists

Women medallists

Most wins 
As of the 2013/14 season:
  Taddy Blazusiak: 42
  David Knight: 7
  Iván Cervantes: 6
  Jonathan Walker: 3
  Daniel Gibert: 2
  Antoine Méo: 1
  Thomas Oldrati: 1
  Joakim Ljunggren: 1
  Mika Ahola: 1
  Daniel Gibert: 1
  Alfredo Gómez: 1
  Mathias Bellino: 1

References

External links 
 
 FIM SuperEnduro World Championship at the FIM website
 News FIM SuperEnduro World Championship 2015

World motorcycle racing series
Motorcycle off-road racing series